19-Nordehydroepiandrosterone (19-nor-DHEA), or 19-nor-5-dehydroepiandrosterone (19-nor-5-DHEA), is an estrane (19-norandrostane) steroid which was never marketed. It is the combined derivative of the androgen/anabolic steroid nandrolone (19-nortestosterone) and the androgen prohormone dehydroepiandrosterone (DHEA, or more specifically 5-DHEA). Related compounds include 19-nor-5-androstenediol, bolandiol (19-nor-4-androstenediol), and bolandione (nor-4-androstenedione), which are all known orally active prohormones of nandrolone. 19-Nor-DHEA may occur as a metabolite of bolandione and related steroids.

See also
 List of androgens/anabolic steroids

References

Abandoned drugs
Secondary alcohols
Androgens and anabolic steroids
Estranes
Estrogens
Prodrugs
Progestogens